"Cowboy" is a song by Dutch pop group Ch!pz. It was released in the Netherlands in 2003 and peaked at number one on the Dutch Top 40 and Single Top 100 charts. It was then released in other areas of Europe across the next four year, reaching number one in Austria and Germany and peaking within the top 10 in Scotland, Sweden, and Switzerland.

Music video
In the music video, Ch!pz are summoned from the Wild West and sent back in time to help the townsfolk stop a horse thief.

Charts

Weekly charts

Year-end charts

Decade-end charts

Release history

References

Ch!pz songs
2003 singles
2003 songs
Number-one singles in Austria
Number-one singles in Germany